Sugunia was the first capital of Arame of Urartu. The city was mentioned in an inscription by the Assyrian king Shalmaneser III, who destroyed it in 858 BCE.

The Monolith Inscription of Shalmaneser III:

Although its exact location is unknown, Shalamaneser III's placement of Sugunia near "the sea of Nairi" has led some scholars to place it near Lake Van or near Lake Urmia.

After Sugunia was sacked and burnt by Shalmaneser III, Arame moved his capital to Arzashkun, which was subsequently attacked by the Assyrians in 856 BCE.

References

Urartian cities
Former populated places in Turkey
Archaeological sites in Eastern Anatolia